Treehouse Hostage is a 1999 family film directed by Sean McNamara and starring Jim Varney and Joey Zimmerman. It was one of Varney's final on-screen roles; he was diagnosed with terminal lung cancer during production of the film.

Plot summary
Carl Banks (Jim Varney) is a dangerous counterfeiter and escapes from jail. Meanwhile, 11-year-old Timmy Taylor (Joey Zimmerman) has a current project due on Monday and if he shows up empty handed he is going to summer school, simply because of his participation in class, and that his teacher and Principal Ott (Richard Kline) hate him.

Carl Banks tries to print some more money and finds one of the counterfeit plates but can't print any money when his crooked ex-boss and his cops, who are counterfeiters as well, catch him at his base. He runs into Timmy Taylor's backyard and ends up in his treehouse. Timmy and his two best friends keep him hostage in Timmy's treehouse so that Timmy can take him to school on Monday to ace Current Events.

However, keeping a major criminal hostage is more of a handful than they expected, due to the huge wedgies that Carl delivers. Until Timmy figures out that Carl is in the middle of a major counterfeit ring, Timmy & his friends help get revenge on the men who treated Carl badly (surprisingly, Timmy's principal is Carl's ex-boss who turned him in to the authorities), in exchange for counterfeit money, of course.

Timmy and his friends persuade his neighbor and rival Janie Paulson and her friend Angela to help them create a fake cash plate in order to lay a trap and Carl captured Ott and his men. The evil principal gets away, Carl is set free as the kids tape recorded them running into the counterfeit gang and it proves Carl's innocence. Carl is offered witness protection if he cooperates and he does.

At school on Monday, Timmy's teacher doesn't believe his story until the police show up with Carl and arrest the principal for being the counterfeit gang's leader. As the school applauds Timmy and celebrates Ott's defeat, Janie kisses Timmy on the cheek. Timmy also gets a reward check for his actions which his dog buries in the backyard later that night.

Cast
 Jim Varney as Carl Banks
 Joey Zimmerman as Timmy Taylor
 Kristopher Kachurak as Buddy
 Todd Bosley as Stevie
 Mark Moses as Mr. Taylor
 Debby Boone as Mrs. Taylor
 Richard Kline as Principal Ott
 Jack McGee as Nick
 Christopher Doyle as Scalise
 Aria Noelle Curzon as Janie Paulson
 Cliff "Fatty" Emmich as Detective Nelson
 Louan Gideon as Mrs. Stevens
 Frank Welker as Kato (voice)
 Vincent Schiavelli as Gardener (uncredited)

Release 
Treehouse Hostage was released direct to video in June 1999.

Reception 
Critical reception for the film has been mixed. The AV Club described Treehouse Hostage as a "rather dismal Disney Channel movie". Video Business was more favorable, as they felt "Harmless enough summer-vacation video fare, Hostage is bright and clever without relying on Varney's wom-out Ernest persona for laughs." The Fort Worth Star-Telegram also rated the film favorably.

References

External links
 
 

1999 films
1990s adventure comedy films
Films directed by Sean McNamara
1990s children's comedy films
Trimark Pictures films
American children's comedy films
1999 comedy films
Counterfeit money in film
1990s English-language films
1990s American films